St Aidan's College may refer to:

 St Aidan's College, Birkenhead, a former Church of England theological college
 St Aidan's College, Durham, England, part of the University of Durham
 St Aidan's Theological College, Ballarat, a former Anglican college in Australia